Paul Cabatingan is a Filipino athlete who competed in taekwondo and a pioneer of the same in the Philippines. He won a silver medal at the 1976 Asian Taekwondo Championships and in Guayaqil in 1982 in the 53 kg category. He is now a lawyer by profession passing the Philippine Bar Examination in 2016.

References 

Filipino martial artists
Filipino male taekwondo practitioners
Asian Taekwondo Championships medalists
Living people
21st-century Filipino lawyers
Year of birth missing (living people)